Aleksandr Leonidovich Khazanov (May 4, 1979 – disappeared June 10, 2001) is a Russian American mathematician. A child prodigy, he wrote a perfect paper at the International Mathematical Olympiad 1994,  one of the youngest ever to do so. Khazanov was reported missing in June 2001. He suffered from depression or bipolar disorder at the time of his disappearance.

Biography
Born to Anna and Leonid Khazanov, a math professor, Aleksandr had attended a special school for math students several years older in Leningrad, Soviet Union (now Saint Petersburg, Russia), before his family fled antisemitic threats and moved to Brooklyn, New York, United States as refugees in 1992. He attended Stuyvesant High School and showed his exceptional talent in mathematics. In the summer of 1994, he passed qualifying exams for Penn State University's doctoral program in math, and he was the youngest member on the United States team for the International Mathematical Olympiad of which all six members got perfect scores. In the following year, he was named a finalist and eventually placed 7th at the 54th Westinghouse Science Talent Search for a paper dealing with a variant of Fermat's Last Theorem, mentored by Leonid Vaserstein, a math professor at Penn State University also from Russia. He represented the United States for the second time in the 1995 International Mathematical Olympiad, and he entered the PhD math program at Penn State University right after high school in fall 1995.

Disappearance
In the morning of June 10, 2001, he left home with his mountain bike and went missing, leaving a note in Russian saying "I went to a library." He was taking a semester leave due to personal problems, and had been taking drugs for depression, but he did not bring them when he left home.

See also
List of people who disappeared

References

External links

1979 births
2001 deaths
2000s missing person cases
American people of Russian-Jewish descent
International Mathematical Olympiad participants
Mathematicians from New York (state)
Missing person cases in New York City
People from Brooklyn
Russian emigrants to the United States
Stuyvesant High School alumni
People from Saint Petersburg